Brent Almond (born March 3, 1983) is an American film producer. He has recently been nominated for a Grammy for best Music Film for I'll Sleep When I'm Dead.

Career
In 2016, Almond produced the comedy Masterminds; a heist movie starring Zach Galifianakis, Kristen Wiig, Owen Wilson and Jason Sudeikis.

Filmography (as a producer)

Film

References

External links
 
 

American film producers
1983 births
Living people